Trygve Stokstad (25 November 1902 – 26 April 1979) was a Norwegian boxer who competed in the 1920 Summer Olympics and in the 1924 Summer Olympics.

In 1920 he was eliminated in the quarter-finals of the welterweight class after losing his fight to William Clark. Four years later he was eliminated in the first round of the middleweight class after losing his fight to Harry Mallin who was on the way to win his second consecutive Olympic gold medal.

References

External links
 List of Norwegian boxers

1902 births
1979 deaths
Welterweight boxers
Middleweight boxers
Olympic boxers of Norway
Boxers at the 1920 Summer Olympics
Boxers at the 1924 Summer Olympics
Norwegian male boxers
20th-century Norwegian people